Xtabi is a cove on the cliffs of Negril, in Westmoreland, Jamaica. It consists of a labyrinth of caves and passageways carved from solid rock over millennia of ocean water striking it. 

An eponymous hotel sits atop the cliffs.

History
The first inhabitants of Xtabi were the Ciboney Indians, who arrived from the coast of South America around 500 B.C. The Ciboney who were also known as “Cave dwellers” lived along the cliffs of Negril for hundreds of years before eventually being displaced by the Arawaks in 750 A.D.  The name Xtabi is derived from an Arawak word, which means “meeting place of the gods”.

See also
 List of caves in Jamaica
 List of hotels in Jamaica

References

External links
 Aerial view

Caves of Jamaica
Bays and coves of Jamaica
Tourism in Jamaica
Buildings and structures in Westmoreland Parish
Geography of Westmoreland Parish
Caves of the Caribbean